Cecil John "Jack" Russell (19 June 1904 – 1995) was an English professional footballer who scored 74 goals in 250 appearances in the Football League playing for Birmingham, Bristol Rovers, Bournemouth & Boscombe Athletic, Luton Town and Norwich City. He played as a forward.

Life and career
Russell was born in the Northfield district of Birmingham. He began his football career with local clubs before joining Birmingham of the First Division in February 1924. He made his debut on 18 April 1924, in a 1–0 defeat at Manchester City, but apart from a run of a dozen games at outside left in the 1925–26 season, his Birmingham career consisted of occasional appearances as the replacement for an injured player. In the 1927 close season Russell joined Bristol Rovers. A year later he dropped back into non-league football with Worcester City, and after another two years returned to the Football League with Bournemouth & Boscombe Athletic of the Third Division South. For Bournemouth Russell scored goals at a rate approaching one every three games, and twice in a month scored four goals in a game, a club record. In May 1934 he signed for Luton Town, and five months later joined Norwich City. For the 1936–37 season, Russell returned to Worcester City as player-manager, He later played for Shirley Town and Solihull Town.

Russell died in 1995.

References

1904 births
1995 deaths
Footballers from Birmingham, West Midlands
English footballers
Association football forwards
Bromsgrove Rovers F.C. players
Birmingham City F.C. players
Bristol Rovers F.C. players
Worcester City F.C. players
AFC Bournemouth players
Luton Town F.C. players
Norwich City F.C. players
Shirley Town F.C. players
English Football League players
English football managers
Worcester City F.C. managers
Date of death missing
Place of death missing